Frank Battig (5 December 1935 – 30 September 2015) was an Austrian fencer and modern pentathlete. He competed at the 1960 and 1968 Summer Olympics.

References

1935 births
2015 deaths
Austrian male fencers
Austrian épée fencers
Austrian male modern pentathletes
Olympic fencers of Austria
Olympic modern pentathletes of Austria
Fencers at the 1968 Summer Olympics
Modern pentathletes at the 1960 Summer Olympics
Sportspeople from Graz
20th-century Austrian people